This is a list of the reptiles found in Portugal.

Turtles 
Family: Cheloniidae
 Green sea turtle (Chelonia mydas)
 Hawksbill sea turtle (Eretmochelys imbricata)
 Kemp's ridley sea turtle (Lepidochelys kempii)
 Loggerhead sea turtle (Caretta caretta)
Family: Dermochelyidae
 Leatherback sea turtle (Dermochelys coriacea)
Family: Emydinae
 European pond turtle (Emys orbicularis)
 Red-eared slider (Trachemys scripta)
Family: Geoemydidae
 Mediterranean pond turtle (Mauremys leprosa)

Amphisbaenians (worm lizards) 
 Blanus cinereus
 Blanus mariae

Lizards 
Family: Anguidae
 Slowworm (Anguis fragilis)
Family: Chamaeleonidae
 Gemeines chameleon (Chamaeleo chamaeleon)
Family: Gekkonidae
 House gecko (Hemidactylus mabouia)
 Mediterranean house gecko (Hemidactylus turcicus)
 Moorish gecko (Tarentola mauritanica)
Family: Lacertidae
 Algerian psammodromus (Psammodromus algirus)
 Andalusian wall lizard (Podarcis vaucheri)
 Bocage's wall lizard (Podarcis bocagei)
 Carbonell's wall lizard (Podarcis carbonelli)
 Iberian emerald lizard (Lacerta schreiberi)
 Iberian mountain lizard (Iberolacerta monticola)
 Iberian wall lizard (Podarcis hispanicus)
 Madeira wall lizard (Teira dugesii)
 Ocellated lizard (Timon lepidus)
 Red-tailed spiny footed lizard (Acanthodactylus erythrurus)
 Spanish psammodromus (Psammodromus hispanicus)
Family: Scinidae
 Cylindrical skink (Chalcides chalcides)
 Fogo skink (Chioninia fogoensis)
 Spanish cylindrical skink (Chalcides bedriagai)
 Western three-toed skink (Chalcides striatus)

Snakes 
Family: Colubridae
 False smooth snake (Macroprotodon cucullatus)
 Iberian grass snake (Natrix astreptophora)
 Horseshoe snake (Hemorrhois hippocrepis)
 Ladder snake (Rhinechis scalaris)
 Smooth snake (Coronella austriaca)
 Southern smooth snake (Coronella girondica)
 Viperine water snake (Natrix maura)
 Western false smooth snake (Macroprotodon brevis)
Family: Lamprophiidae
 Montpelier snake (Malpolon monspessulanus)
Family: Viperidae
 Lataste's viper (Vipera latastei)
 Portuguese viper (Vipera seoanei)

References

External links 
 The Reptile Database

Reptiles
Portugal
Portugal
Reptiles